These are the official results of the Women's 200 metres Individual Medley event at the 1993 FINA Short Course World Championships held in Palma de Mallorca, Spain.

Finals

Qualifying heats

See also
1992 Women's Olympic Games 200m Medley
1993 Women's European LC Championships 200m Medley

References
 Results
 swimrankings

M
1993 in women's swimming